Mikko Markkanen (born 9 January 1977) is a Finnish ice hockey player who spent all of his playing years in the I-Divisioona and Mestis second-level league in Finland.

He was drafted into the National Hockey League by the San Jose Sharks in the ninth round in the 1995 NHL Entry Draft.

He is not related to Finnish goaltender Jussi Markkanen

Career statistics

Regular season and playoffs

International

References

1977 births
Finnish ice hockey right wingers
Living people
San Jose Sharks draft picks
TuTo players
Sportspeople from Turku